Pulau Seringat is an island off the south coast of Singapore, and part of the Southern Islands region.

Islands of Singapore